Marcos Coelho Neto (1763–1823) was a Brazilian composer.  Born in mining colony of Ouro Preto in 1763, his father was a former slave who became a trumpet player and composer.  The younger Coelho Neto followed his father as a composer and instrumental performer.  In 1785 he was placed in charge of the productions of three operas and two dramas celebrating the marriage of João VI and Carlota Joaquina. Coelho Neto is best known today as the composer of the hymn Maria mater gratiae. (1796), which is noted for its elegance and creativity.  He died on October 23, 1823 in Ouro Preto.

References

1763 births
1823 deaths
Brazilian composers
People from Ouro Preto
Culture in Minas Gerais